The Yale Club may be:

The Yale Club of New York City
The Yale Club of Philadelphia
The Yale Club of Washington
The Yale Glee Club
The Yale Corinthian Yacht Club